Mark Yakich is an American poet, novelist, and the Gregory F. Curtin, S.J., Distinguished Professor of English at Loyola University New Orleans. Yakich co-founded and co-edits Airplane Reading, a media venue dedicated to collecting travelers' stories about flight. He is director of Loyola's Center for Editing & Publishing. From 2012-2020, he was editor of New Orleans Review.

Awards
His collection of poems Unrelated Individuals Forming a Group Waiting to Cross was one of five winners of the National Poetry Series in 2003. Another collection, The Making of Collateral Beauty, won the Snowbound Chapbook Award and was published by Tupelo Press in 2006. He has also published The Importance of Peeling Potatoes in Ukraine (Penguin Poets, 2008), Green Zone New Orleans (Press Street, 2008), and Spiritual Exercises (Penguin Poets, 2019). Yakich's first novel, A Meaning for Wife, was named by the National Book Critics Circle as the No. 1 Small Press Highlight for 2011.

Yakich was a Fulbright Fellow (2011–12) and taught in the School of Letters at the University of Lisbon, Portugal. He was a Resident Fellow (summer 2022) at The American College of the Mediterranean, Aix-en-Provence.

In 2019, Yakich was awarded the Dux Academicus award, Loyola University's highest honor given to a faculty member by their peers.

Books

References

External links
Poems at The American Academy of Poets: "You Are Not a Statue"; "Troubadour"; "Things Said to Be Ineffable"
Poem "Old Celery" at The Writer's Almanac
Poem "For My Daughter" at LitHub
"The Twelfth Apostle" at Narrative Magazine 
Interview with the author from The Georgia Review
An interview about Airplane Reading (with Christopher Schaberg)
Checking In/Checking Out featured at For Print Only
An interview with Yakich at phillyBurbs.com
Mark Yakich interviews Sister Helen Prejean in New Orleans Review
Review of Spiritual Exercises in Colorado Review
"How Should a Professor Be?" in Inside Higher Ed (with Christopher Schaberg)
Interview on Susan Larson's "The Reading Life" -- Football (soccer): An Object Lesson, Bloomsbury 2022
"Writer Yakich Reflects on Untraditional Poetic Path," The Argus, Illinois Wesleyan University
"Language is the Game in 'Ted Lasso'" The New York Review of Books

American academics of English literature
American male poets
Loyola University New Orleans faculty
Living people
Year of birth missing (living people)
American male non-fiction writers